Richard Brevard Russell Jr. (November 2, 1897 – January 21, 1971) was an American politician. A member of the Democratic Party, he served as the 66th Governor of Georgia from 1931 to 1933 before serving in the United States Senate for almost 40 years, from 1933 to 1971. Russell was a founder and leader of the conservative coalition that dominated Congress from 1937 to 1963, and at his death was the most senior member of the Senate. He was for decades a leader of Southern opposition to the civil rights movement.

Born in Winder, Georgia, Russell established a legal practice in Winder after graduating from the University of Georgia School of Law. He served in the Georgia House of Representatives from 1921 to 1931 before becoming Governor of Georgia. Russell won a special election to succeed Senator William J. Harris and joined the Senate in 1933. He supported the New Deal early in his Senate career but helped establish the conservative coalition of Southern Democrats. He was the chief sponsor of the National School Lunch Act, which provided free or low-cost school lunches to impoverished students.

During his long tenure in the Senate, Russell served as chairman of several committees, and was the Chairman of the Senate Committee on Armed Services for most of the period between 1951 and 1969. He was a candidate for President of the United States at the 1948 Democratic National Convention and the 1952 Democratic National Convention. He was also a member of the Warren Commission.

Russell supported racial segregation and co-authored the Southern Manifesto with Strom Thurmond. Russell and 17 fellow Democratic Senators, along with one Republican, blocked the passage of civil rights legislation via the filibuster. After Russell's protégé, President Lyndon B. Johnson, signed the Civil Rights Act of 1964 into law, Russell led a Southern boycott of the 1964 Democratic National Convention. Russell served in the Senate until his death from emphysema in 1971.

Early life
Richard B. Russell Jr. was born in 1897 as the first son of Georgia Supreme Court Chief Justice Richard B. Russell Sr. and Ina Russell. He eventually had a total of twelve adult siblings, as well as two who died before adolescence.

Throughout Russell Jr.'s childhood, his father made multiple attempts to run for higher political office. Though he was a well-liked state representative for Clarke County and a successful solicitor general for a seven-county circuit, he fared poorly in multiple attempts to become U.S. Senator for Georgia and Governor of Georgia. Due to his political failures, the Russell family lived below their financial means at times. 

From an early age, the elder Russell trained his son to succeed his father's legacy in the state. Due to the family's loss of their ancestral plantation and mill during Sherman's March, the Russells subscribed to the Lost Cause myth of history. Russell spent much of his adolescence studying Civil War history, as well as the history of Ancient Rome and Classical Greece. 

Russell enrolled in the University of Georgia School of Law in 1915 and earned a Bachelor of Laws (LL.B.) degree in 1918. While at UGA, he was a member of the Phi Kappa Literary Society.

Dominated by white conservatives, Democrats controlled state government and the Congressional delegation. The Republican Party was no longer competitive, hollowed out in the state following the effective disenfranchisement of most blacks by Georgia's approval of a constitutional amendment, effective in 1908, requiring a literacy test, but providing a "grandfather clause" to create exceptions for whites.

Early political career 
Following his time at college, Russell briefly worked at a law firm with his father before successfully running for the Georgia House of Representatives at the earliest opportunity. Six years into his tenure, Russell ran unopposed for the Speakership at the age of 29. His popularity among his legislator colleagues came from his perceived integrity and willingness to build coalitions.

Governor of Georgia, 1931–1933

As governor, Russell reorganized the bureaucracy, promoted economic development in the midst of the Great Depression, and balanced the state budget.

During Russell's governorship, World War I veteran Robert Elliot Burns released the autobiography I Am A Fugitive from a Georgia Chain Gang!, which had previously been serialized in True Detective magazine and would become a popular Paul Muni film in November 1932. The book details the multiple stints Burns served in the Georgian penal system and his attempts to escape. 

Following the release of the book and the film adaptation, Russell attempted to extradite Burns from the state of New Jersey so Burns could continue to serve his sentence. Russell denounced Burns' depictions of the horrific hard labor in his state, calling New Jersey Governor A. Harry Moore's refusal to return Burns to Georgia "a slander on the state of Georgia and its institutions."

Senate career, 1933–1971
Russell at first supported the New Deal of President Franklin D. Roosevelt during the Great Depression. In 1936, he defeated the demagogic former Governor Eugene Talmadge for the US Senate seat by defending the New Deal as good for Georgia.

During World War II, Russell was known for his uncompromising position toward Japan and its civilian casualties. In the late months of the war, he held that the US should not treat Japan with more lenience than Germany, and that the United States should not encourage Japan to sue for peace.

Russell's support for first-term senator Lyndon B. Johnson paved the way for Johnson to become Senate Majority Leader. Russell often dined at Johnson's house during their Senate days. But, their 20-year friendship came to an end during Johnson's presidency, in a fight over the 1968 nomination as Chief Justice of Abe Fortas, Johnson's friend and Supreme Court justice.

In early 1956, Russell's office was continually used as a meeting place by Southern fellow senators Strom Thurmond, James Eastland, Allen Ellender, and John Stennis, the four having a commonality of being dispirited with Brown v. Board of Education, the 1954 ruling by the US Supreme Court that said that segregation in public schools was unconstitutional.

In May 1961, President John F. Kennedy requested Russell place the Presidential wreath at the Tomb of the Unknowns during an appearance at Arlington National Cemetery for a Memorial Day ceremony.

Russell scheduled a closed door meeting for the Senate Armed Services Committee for August 31, 1961, at the time of Senator Strom Thurmond requesting the committee vote on whether to vote to investigate "a conspiracy to muzzle military anti-Communist drives."

In late February 1963, the Senate Armed Services Committee was briefed by Defense Secretary Robert McNamara on policy in the Caribbean. Russell said afterward that he believed that American airmen would strike down foreign jets in international waters and only inquire on the aircraft’s purpose there afterward.

In January 1964, President Johnson delivered the 1964 State of the Union Address, calling for Congress to "lift by legislation the bars of discrimination against those who seek entry into our country, particularly those who have much needed skills and those joining their families." Russell issued a statement afterward stating the commitment by Southern senators to oppose such a measure, which he called "shortsighted and disastrous," while admitting the high probability of it passing. He added that the civil rights bill's true intended effect was to intermingle races, eliminate states' rights, and abolish the checks and balances system.

Although he had served as a prime mentor of Johnson, Russell and Johnson disagreed over civil rights. Johnson supported this as President. Russell, a segregationist, had repeatedly blocked and defeated federal civil rights legislation via use of the filibuster.

Unlike Theodore Bilbo, "Cotton Ed" Smith, and James Eastland, who had reputations as ruthless, tough-talking, heavy-handed race baiters, Russell never justified hatred or acts of violence to defend segregation. But he strongly defended white supremacy and apparently did not question it or ever apologize for his segregationist views, votes and speeches. Russell was key, for decades, in blocking meaningful civil rights legislation intended to protect African Americans from lynching, disenfranchisement, and disparate treatment under the law. After Johnson signed the Civil Rights Act of 1964, Russell (along with more than a dozen other southern Senators, including Herman Talmadge and Russell Long) boycotted the 1964 Democratic National Convention in Atlantic City.

From 1963 to 1964, Russell was one of the members of the Warren Commission, which was charged to investigate the assassination of President John F. Kennedy in November 1963. Russell's personal papers indicated that he was troubled by the Commission's single-bullet theory, the Soviet Union's failure to provide greater detail regarding Lee Harvey Oswald's period in Russia, and the lack of information regarding Oswald's Cuba-related activities.

In June 1968, Chief Justice Earl Warren announced his decision to retire. President Johnson afterward announced the nomination of Associate Justice Abe Fortas for the position. David Greenburg wrote that when Russell "decided in early July to oppose Fortas, he brought most of his fellow Dixiecrats with him."

Russell was a prominent supporter of a strong national defense. He used his powers as chairman of the Senate Armed Services Committee from 1951 to 1969, and then as chairman of the Senate Appropriations Committee as an institutional base to gain defense installations and jobs for Georgia. He was dubious about the Vietnam War, privately warning President Johnson repeatedly against deeper involvement.

Legacy
Russell was seen as a hero by many of the pro Jim Crow South. While undoubtedly a skilled politician of immense influence, his legacy is marred by his lifelong support of white supremacy. Russell publicly said that America was “a white man’s country, yes, and we are going to keep it that way.” He also said he was vehemently opposed to “political and social equality with the Negro.” Russell also supported poll taxes across the South and called President Truman's support of civil rights for black Americans an “uncalled-for attack on our Southern civilization."

Russell has been honored by having the following named for him:
 The Russell Senate Office Building, oldest of the three U.S. Senate office buildings. In 2018, Senate minority leader Charles Schumer called for the renaming of the building with the name of recently deceased Senator John McCain.
 The Richard B. Russell Special Collections Building at the University of Georgia in Athens, Georgia, which houses the Hargrett Rare Book and Manuscript Library, the Russell Library for Political Research and Studies, the Walter J. Brown Media Archives, and the Peabody Awards Collection.
 Russell Hall, a co-ed dormitory for first-year students at the University of Georgia in Athens, Georgia.
 Russell Hall, a building at the University of Georgia College of Public Health that houses nineteen classrooms within the University of Georgia in Athens, Georgia.
 The Russell Auditorium at Georgia College and State University in Milledgeville, Georgia.
 Richard B. Russell Dam and Lake, part of the Richard B. Russell Multiple Resource Area, located on the upper Savannah River between Elberton, Georgia, and Calhoun Falls, South Carolina. A Georgia state park on the shores of that lake also bears Russell's name.
 The Richard B. Russell Airport in Rome, Georgia, the regional general aviation airport serving Floyd County, Georgia.
 Senator Russell's Sweet Potatoes are a favorite southern dish around the holidays.
 USS Richard B. Russell (SSN-687), a Sturgeon-class attack submarine.
 Richard B. Russell Highway, a part of the Russell–Brasstown Scenic Byway
 Richard B. Russell Parkway in Fort Valley, Georgia
 Richard B. Russell Middle School in Winder, Georgia
In 2020, former Georgia Board of Regents Chairman Sachin Shailendra and then Chancellor Steve Wrigley of the University System of Georgia tasked an advisory group to review the names of buildings and colleges across all campuses within the USG. Members of the advisory group consisted of Marion Fedrick, the tenth and current president of Albany State University in Albany, Georgia, Michael Patrick of Chick-fil-A, retired judge Herbert Phipps of the Georgia Court of Appeals, current chairman of the University of Georgia Foundation, Neal J. Quirk Sr., and Dr. Sally Wallace, the current dean of the Andrew Young School of Policy Studies of Georgia State University in Atlanta, Georgia.

Despite recommendations from the advisory group to rename all buildings associated with Russell, the Georgia Board of Regents did not move forward with any of the final recommendations from the advisory group's report.

See also

References

Further sources

Primary sources
 Logue, Calvin McLeod and Freshley, Dwight L., eds. (1997). Voice of Georgia: Speeches of Richard B. Russell, 1928–1969

Scholarly secondary sources

 Campbell, Charles E. (2013). Senator Richard B. Russell and my Career as a Trial Lawyer. Macon, GA: Mercer University Press)
 Caro, Robert A. (2002). The Years of Lyndon Johnson, vol 3: Master of the Senate
 Fite, Gilbert (2002). Richard B. Russell Jr., Senator from Georgia
 Finley, Keith M. (2008). Delaying the Dream: Southern Senators and the Fight Against Civil Rights, 1938–1965 Baton Rouge: LSU Press 
 
 Goldsmith, John A. (1993). Colleagues: Richard B. Russell and His Apprentice, Lyndon B. Johnson.
 Grant, Philip A. Jr. "Editorial Reaction to the 1952 Presidential Candidacy of Richard B. Russell." Georgia Historical Quarterly 1973 57(2): 167–178.
 Mann, Robert (1996). The Walls of Jericho: Lyndon Johnson, Hubert Humphrey, Richard Russell and the Struggle for Civil Rights.
 Mead, Howard N. "Russell vs. Talmadge: Southern Politics and the New Deal." Georgia Historical Quarterly 1981 65(1): 28–45.
 Shelley II, Mack C. (1983). The Permanent Majority: The Conservative Coalition in the United States Congress
 Ziemke, Caroline F. "Senator Richard B. Russell and the 'Lost Cause' in Vietnam, 1954–1968," Georgia Historical Quarterly'' 1988 72(1): 30–71.

External links

 Richard Brevard Russell Jr. biography 
 Letter from Senator Russell to President Truman 7 August 1945 after Bombing of Hiroshima 
 The New Georgia Encyclopedia entry for Richard B. Russell Jr. 
 Richard B. Russell Library for Political Research and Studies
 Russell Community and Hall at UGA
 Richard B. Russell State Park
 
 Legends of the Dead-Ball Era, 1909–1913: Childhood baseball card collection of Richard B. Russell Jr. from the Digital Library of Georgia
 Russell House historical marker

1897 births
1971 deaths
20th-century American politicians
American segregationists
American white supremacists
Candidates in the 1948 United States presidential election
Candidates in the 1952 United States presidential election
Deaths from emphysema
Democratic Party governors of Georgia (U.S. state)
Democratic Party United States senators from Georgia (U.S. state)
Georgia (U.S. state) lawyers
Gordon State College alumni
Democratic Party members of the Georgia House of Representatives
Members of the Warren Commission
Military personnel from Georgia (U.S. state)
Old Right (United States)
People from Winder, Georgia
Presidents pro tempore of the United States Senate
Speakers of the Georgia House of Representatives
United States Navy personnel of World War I
University of Georgia alumni
Conservatism in the United States